Suzan Bushnaq (born November 2, 1963)  is a Kuwaiti artist. Her paintings are principally impressionistic images related to women's vitality, power, and beauty.

She is the daughter of Palestinian artist Mohammed Bushnaq (born 1934) and she learned her art from him and at the Russian College of Art (1982–1989).

Exhibitions
Suzan Bushnaq has had exhibitions (2006 and 2008) at the Art Gallery (Kuwait) (under the auspices of the National Council for Culture and Arts and exhibitions at the Al Kharafi Biennale (2004) and at the Qurain Cultural Festival (2004, 2005, 2010).
She has also had exhibitions in the lounge room of Boushahri Art Gallery 1999-2001-2003 and an exhibition at Dar Al Funoon Gallery in 2006.

Awards
She has been awarded an Arbitration Award at the Kharafi Biennial, won awards at the Qurain Festival and an Issa Sakr award.

References

External links 
 Suzan Bushnaq at q8art.net
 https://web.archive.org/web/20110707113249/http://www.aljarida.com/aljarida/Article.aspx?id=101916
 https://web.archive.org/web/20110716175419/http://www.alqabas.com.kw/Article.aspx?id=443586&date=02112008
 http://alrairadio.com/Alrai/Article.aspx?id=181572&text=%C3%CD%E3%CF%20%C3%ED%E6%C8&date=24072010

Living people
1963 births
Kuwaiti women artists
Kuwaiti people of Bosniak descent
Kuwaiti people of Palestinian descent
Kuwaiti contemporary artists